Unity of the Brethren (Latin Unitas Fratrum) may refer to:

Unity of the Brethren (Czech Republic), the province of the Moravian Church in the Czech Republic
Unity of the Brethren (Texas), a Protestant church formed in the 1800s by Czech immigrants to Texas
Unity of the Brethren Baptists, a Baptist denomination in the Czech Republic
Minor Party (Unity of the Brethren), a Christian group in Bohemia that split from the Unity of the Brethren during the 1490s
Moravian Church or Unitas Fratrum, a Protestant denomination dating to the Bohemian Reformation of the 15th century

See also
History of the Moravian Church, the Moravian Church's origin in the early fourteenth century to the beginning of mission work in 1732
Bohemian Reformation, a Christian movement in the late medieval and early modern Bohemia for reform of the Roman Catholic Church